Ophrys caucasica is a flowering plant endemic to the Caucasus. It has been recorded in numerous areas throughout Azerbaijan, Armenia, Georgia and Russia.

The overall distribution of the species, according to Delforge, ranges from coastal massifs of north-east Anatolia, from Trabzon in the west, probably to the Caspian Sea.

Ophrys caucasica is used to be the most popular flower in Azerbaijan, specially Karabakh region Azerbaijani Republic. The  Ophrys caucasica flower used to be the symbol of Azerbaijani city Shusha. During the Second Karabakh War, it became a symbol of the entire Karabakh, and later became a symbol of Azerbaijani victory and the spirit of Azerbaijani martyrs.

Although the plant commonly called Kharibulbul in Azerbaijan is the main species of Ophrys caucasica, it is likely that all species of the Ophrys plant are called by this name in Azerbaijan. According to the IUCN Red List, the category and status of the species is "Endangered" – EN B1ab(iii)+2ab(iii). It is an endemic species.

Every year in the May, Khari Bulbul Music Festival is held in the Azerbaijani city of Shusha and different other cities like Aghdam, Aghjabadi and Barda.

Etymology 

The word "khari" from the name "Khari Bulbul" is an epithet in Azerbaijani language, that is, it should be related to the characteristics of this flower. One of the important characteristics of the  Ophrys caucasica is the color, in which the various colors (green, yellow, red, etc.) are mixed together, and the white petal, which is part of the same petal, turns into another pink. There are even patterns on the part below the chest of the  Ophrys caucasica. The writer A. Valiyev describes this kind of elegance as follows: "As the sun sets, the leaves of the trees change from color to color, like a piece of wood, they turn into various colors at once."  

Khara in Azerbaijani is a thick and shiny fabric with different patterns on it. The names of robes and mattresses made from it can be found both in the works of Azerbaijani writers and in Azerbaijani epics. When you move this piece or look at it from different angles, it changes from color to color. It is precisely because of the presence of these characteristics of the khara piece in the Ophrys caucasica that it was called "khara nightingale" (full translation is, "nightingale with black clothes"). The pronunciation of the word "Khara" as "Khari" in the colloquial language is related to the requirement of the law of harmony in Azerbaijani language.

But also in Armenian, its name (Sardakir Mexvakir) refers to its primary pollinators, spiders (or 'Sard') and bees (or 'Mexu') and their food (or 'kir').

Exhibition 
In 2014 an exhibition titled "Khari bulbul, a flower of peace and love" was organized by the Federal National Cultural Autonomy of Azerbaijanis in Russia. In March, 2014 a presentation ceremony of Ophrys caucasica took place in the United States Botanic Garden Conservatory.

Gallery

References

External links 
 Hari bulbul – the flower of peace and love
 The meaning of the word of Khari Bulbul
 

caucasica